The Craig Goch Dam, often called the Top dam, is a masonry dam in the Elan Valley of Wales and creates the upper-most of the Elan Valley Reservoirs. Construction on the dam began in 1897, and it was completed in 1904. The primary purpose of the dam and the other reservoirs is to supply Birmingham with water. In 1997, a 480 kW hydroelectric generator began operation at the dam.

Potential river transfer scheme
The Craig Goch reservoir  had been identified in the 1970s and in the 1990s as a potential source of water for the south-east of England. The latest project envisaged raising the existing dam, adding a secondary dam at the head of the River Ystwyth valley and piping water from the high head generated into the River Severn and subsequently transferring it by pipeline aqueduct to the head-waters of the River Thames in the Cotswolds.

Media appearances 

Craig Goch Dam was featured prominently in Episode 3 Series 3 of BBC Wales drama series Hinterland, broadcast 2017.

References

Dams in Wales
Hydroelectric power stations in Wales
Dams completed in 1904
Masonry dams
Rhayader